Luis Enrique Charles (born 3 December 1998) is a sprinter from the Dominican Republic. He competed in the 4 × 400 m relay at the 2016 Olympics, but failed to reach the final.

International competitions

References

1998 births
Living people
Dominican Republic male sprinters
Olympic athletes of the Dominican Republic
Athletes (track and field) at the 2016 Summer Olympics
Universiade medalists in athletics (track and field)
Universiade gold medalists for the Dominican Republic
Athletes (track and field) at the 2019 Pan American Games
Pan American Games competitors for the Dominican Republic
Medalists at the 2017 Summer Universiade